On 23 December 2002, the national association football teams of Indonesia and the Philippines faced each other in a 2002 Tiger Cup group stage game. The match was played at the Gelora Bung Karno Stadium in Jakarta.

Before the  match, Indonesia needed a winning margin of more than three goals in order to ensure they would advance to the next round or hope that the match between Myanmar and Vietnam played at the same time did not end in a draw.

Background
Historical meetings between Indonesia and the Philippines first began at the Asian Games in 1958, when Indonesia beat the Philippines 5–2. Since then, they met a total of 17 times, with 16 wins for Indonesia and a draw. The draw was obtained when the two teams met at the 1977 SEA Games in Kuala Lumpur, Malaysia. Indonesia scored a total of 80 goals past the Philippines, while the Philippines only scored 8.

Summary
Indonesia started the game very quickly. Indonesia was able to destroy the Philippine defence and scored 7 goals in the first half, including two hat-tricks by Bambang Pamungkas and Zaenal Arif. The Indonesian supporters did not believe that such a big win can be obtained by their national team.

In the second half, Indonesia scored another 6 goals. Although the Philippines had responded with a goal, but Indonesia advanced anyway with 8 points, behind Vietnam who won the group with 10 points. Meanwhile, Myanmar ranked third, losing to Indonesia by a single point and the Philippines finished last with no points at all.

Match details

References

2002 AFF Championship
Indonesia national football team matches
Philippines national football team matches
Record association football wins
December 2002 sports events in Asia
AFF Championship matches